Strabane Grammar School was a grammar school located just outside Strabane, County Tyrone, Northern Ireland. It was within the Western Education and Library Board area. As part of the 2020 scheme, the school was officially shut down on 30 June 2011 to join with Strabane High School, to create Strabane Academy.

Location
It overlooked the River Mourne to the south of the town.

History

The main school building, Milltown House, was built in 1887 and for a time was the residence of hymn-writer and poet Mrs. Cecil Frances Alexander, best known for her hymn "All Things Bright and Beautiful". Milltown House was used as the headmasters study, the reception, a history room, a staff room, an IT suite and two English rooms.

Past Pupils
 Daniel McCrossan - politician; attended Strabane High School

References

External links
Plaque to Mrs Cecil Frances Alexander at Milltown House

Grammar schools in County Tyrone
Strabane
1956 establishments in Northern Ireland
2011 disestablishments in Northern Ireland
Educational institutions established in 1956
Educational institutions disestablished in 2011
Defunct schools in Northern Ireland